Paying Guests is a 2009 Indian Hindi-language comedy drama film starring Ashish Chaudhary, Shreyas Talpade, Javed Jaffrey, Vatsal Seth, Celina Jaitly, Neha Dhupia, Riya Sen, Sayali Bhagat and Johnny Lever. It is directed by Paritosh Painter under Subhash Ghai's Mukta Arts banner. It is a comedy film revolving around four close friends who reside together in Pattaya. It borrows the basic plot from the 1966 comedy movie Biwi Aur Makan directed by Hrishikesh Mukherjee (which was based on the Bengali movie Joy Maa Kali Boarding) and which was an inspiration for the Marathi movie Ashi Hi Banwa Banwi(1989), Telugu movie Chitram Bhalare Vichitram (1991), two Kannada movies - Bombat Hendthi (1992) and Olu Saar Bari Olu (2003), Tamil movie Aanazhagan (1995), Punjabi  Mr & Mrs 420 (2014) and  Bengali movie Jio Pagla (2017). 

Shooting started in the second week of April 2008. Riya Sen was originally offered Neha Dhupia's role, Aarti Gupta, but declined and instead chose the role as Jayesh's melodramatic girlfriend, Alpita. A sequel, Paying Guests 2, is in production and will take place against the backdrop of a beauty pageant.

Plot
Three friends - Bhavesh (Shreyas Talpade), Parag (Javed Jaffrey) and Pariksheet (Ashish Chaudhary) live in Pattaya, as paying guests in a house owned by Kiska Miglani (Asrani). Bhavesh works as a chef in a restaurant called Namaste India, owned by Ballu Singh (Johnny Lever). Ballu has a younger brother, Ronnie (Chunky Pandey), who wants ownership the restaurant, because he owes a considerable amount of money to a gangster, Murli (Inder Kumar). Parag is a screen writer for a television channel and Parikshit is a car salesman working for Aarti Gupta (Neha Dhupia). Eventually all three of them lose their jobs. The three friends are later joined by Jayesh (Vatsal Seth) from Mumbai, who is a cousin of Parikshit's, and tells them that an apartment is included if he gets a job at an architecture firm. After getting drunk celebrating Jayesh's arrival, they privately insult Kiska, who arrives back home unexpectedly, hears what they are saying and kicks them out. They go out in search of a place to stay and a friend of Parikshit's suggests paid lodgings. Parikshit and Jayesh go to the home to find its owner is Ballu Singh, to whom they are oblivious of the fact that he is Bhavesh's former employer. Ballu and his wife, Sweety (Delnaaz Paul), agree to let them stay on one condition - they must be married.

Parag poses as Jayesh's wife, Kareena, and Bhavesh as Karishma, Parikshit's wife. Jayesh gets the job and will get the allotment to the flat in fifteen days' time. Ballu Singh and Sweety leave to pick up Sweety's sister, Kalpana (Celina Jaitly). When they arrive home, Jayesh's girlfriend, Alpita (Riya Sen), arrives with them and sees the four friends having (what she believes is) sex. She is instantly outraged at Jayesh and leaves him. Meanwhile, Parag seeks permission to marry Seema from her father (Paintel) and Bhavesh, while wooing Kalpana, finds himself in a situation where Ronnie tries to rape Karishma and in the process of saving Bhavesh, Jayesh nearly drowns him by accident.

While discussing the event with Parag and Parikshit, he discovers the apple he has been eating has half a worm in it, Sweety hears Bhavesh vomit and mistakes him for someone being pregnant. In the meantime, Paintel has agreed that Parag can marry Seema, Aarti has fallen for Parikshit, Kalpana has chosen Bhavesh as her life partner and Jayesh has reconciled with Alpita. The four friends decide that it is time for them to tell Ballu and Sweety the truth. In a shopping centre, an accomplice of Ronnie's sees them and tells Ronnie.

When they come home, they find Ronnie, Ballu Singh and Sweety there, but they do not know that anyone except the villain is there. Ronnie has persuaded Ballu to sign the papers transferring ownership of the restaurant, Bhavesh snatches the papers away and they all end up in a theater showing of Mughal-e-Azam, where they all don various costumes and each make their own humorous attempts to retrieve the documents. Ballu gets back the restaurant and forgives them on one condition - they give them the dream of a small child in the house, which they gladly set out to do.

Cast
Ashish Chaudhary as Parikshit Pandey
Shreyas Talpade as Bhavesh Verma / Karishma
 Javed Jaffrey as Parag Melwani / Kareena
 Vatsal Seth as Jayesh Thakur
 Celina Jaitly as Kalpana Singh
Neha Dhupia as Aarti Gupta
Riya Sen as Arpita
 Sayali Bhagat as Seema
 Johnny Lever as Ballu Singh
 Delnaaz Paul as Sweety Singh
 Chunky Pandey as Ronnie
 Asrani as Kiska Miglani
 Inder Kumar as Murli 
 Paintal as Seema's Father

Box office
Paying Guests had a weak start but sales picked up in subsequent weeks and the film was declared a semi-hit.

Music

Music is composed by Sajid–Wajid with lyrics provided by Jalees Sherwani, Wajid, A K Upadhyay.

References

External links
 
 Paying Guests at IndiaFM
 Review at AOL India
 Paying Guest

2009 films
2000s Hindi-language films
Indian comedy films
Hindi remakes of Marathi films
Indian slapstick comedy films
Films shot in Thailand
Cross-dressing in Indian films
2009 comedy films
Hindi-language comedy films
Films set in Pattaya